Alfred Paci is a former Swiss curler. He played  lead position on the Swiss rink that won .

Teams

References

External links
 

Living people

Swiss male curlers
European curling champions
Year of birth missing (living people)